The 39th Krajina Division was a Yugoslav Partisan division formed on 20 March 1944. It was formed from the 13th and 15th Krajina Brigades which in total had around 3,400 fighters. In October 1944, the 20th Krajina Brigade became part of the division. It was part of the 5th Corps and it operated in Bosnia, mostly the region of Bosanska Krajina.

References 

Divisions of the Yugoslav Partisans
Military units and formations established in 1944